The Women's 200 metre butterfly competition of the swimming events at the 2015 World Aquatics Championships was held on 5 August with the heats and the semifinals and 6 August with the final.

Records
Prior to the competition, the existing world and championship records were as follows.

Results

Heats
The heats were held at 10:14.

Semifinals
The semifinals were held at 18:25.

Semifinal 1

Semifinal 2

Final

The final was held at 18.20.

References

Women's 200 metre butterfly
2015 in women's swimming